Douglas Edward Alexander "Eddie" Gustafsson McIntosh (born 31 January 1977) is a Swedish former professional footballer who played as a goalkeeper. Starting off his career with IFK Stockholm in 1993, he went on to play professionally in Norway for three clubs and in Austria for Red Bull Salzburg before retiring in 2014. A full international between 2000 and 2010, he won ten caps for the Sweden national team.

Career

Early career 
Gustafsson grew up in the United States before he moved to Sweden where he started playing for IFK Stockholm and IFK Norrköping before transferring to Norway in 2002, playing for Molde FK. He was their first choice for three seasons, but as his contract expired after the 2004 season he decided to find a new club. He went on several fruitless trials for clubs in Europe and the US, and joined another Norwegian club, Hamarkameratene. The stay only lasted for year. After the 2005 season, Gustafsson signed with FK Lyn.

Red Bull Salzburg 
On 8 January 2009 it was announced that Gustafsson had signed a contract with FC Red Bull Salzburg.

On 18 April 2010, in an Austrian Bundesliga match against LASK Linz, Gustafsson broke his leg when fouled by Linz forward Lukas Kragl. As Gustafsson went to clear the ball following a through pass, Kragl tried to block but was late and caught Gustafsson midway up his left shin. Gustafsson broke both his tibia and fibula in the tackle. Kragl only received a yellow card for the tackle, whilst the same punishment was given to Gustafsson's teammate Christoph Leitgeb for his reaction towards Kragl following the foul. Gustafsson underwent surgery the same night.

Gustafsson celebrated his first post-injury appearance in a midseason friendly against FC Spartak Moscow on 20 January 2011. Over the following years, Gustafsson never fully achieved a comeback to the starting lineup, instead filling the role of backup goalkeeper behind Alexander Walke and later Péter Gulácsi.

Gustafsson last appeared as a goalkeeper in Salzburg's final 2013-2014 Bundesliga home match on 4 May 2014 against SV Ried. He was substituted by Péter Gulácsi in the 78th minute, marking his retirement from professional football.

International career 

Gustafsson made his debut for Sweden on 31 January 2000 in a 1–0 win against Denmark. He was a stand-by player for UEFA Euro 2004 and 2008. He played a total of ten games for Sweden between 2000 and 2010.

Career statistics

International

Honors
Red Bull Salzburg
 Austrian League: 2008–09, 2009–10, 2011–12, 2013–14
 Austrian Cup: 2011–12, 2013–14
Individual

 Goalkeeper of the year (Norway): 2008
 Goalkeeper of the year (Austria): 2010

References

External links
Profile at lynfotball.net
Guardian Football

1977 births
Living people
Swedish people of African-American descent
Swedish footballers
Sweden international footballers
Sweden under-21 international footballers
Sweden youth international footballers
IFK Stockholm players
IFK Norrköping players
Hamarkameratene players
Lyn Fotball players
Molde FK players
American emigrants to Sweden
Expatriate footballers in Norway
Swedish expatriate sportspeople in Norway
FC Red Bull Salzburg players
Expatriate footballers in Austria
Swedish expatriate footballers
Allsvenskan players
Eliteserien players
Austrian Football Bundesliga players
Association football goalkeepers
Soccer players from Philadelphia